Immokalee High School is the only public high school located in Immokalee, Florida. It is a heavily cultured area encompassing ethnicities of Hispanic-decent, Haitian (and Haitian-American) descent, and African American descent.

Athletics 
Immokalee High School is one of the seven Collier County Athletic Conference members.
Collier County Athletic Conference Football Champions in 2005, 2006 and 2011
The Indians captured the 2004 2A State Championship in football. In 2012 the Indians were the 5A State Runner-up. The Indians claimed regional football championships in 2000, 2003, and 2017.
 The Immokalee boys' Track team captured the 2012 CCAA & 2A Regional Championships.
 The Immokalee boys' Soccer team lost the Regional Final in 2012 and 2013. The Indians captured the Regional title in 2014 & 2016 and were the class 5A state runner-up in 2015.

Fall sports 

 Cross Country
 Football
 Golf
 Volleyball

Winter sports 

 Soccer
 Basketball
 Wrestling

Spring sports 
 Lacrosse
 Baseball
 Softball
 Tennis

Notable alumni 
D'Ernest Johnson, NFL player (Cleveland Browns)
Mackensie Alexander, NFL player (Minnesota Vikings)
Deadrin Senat, NFL Player (Atlanta Falcons)
Albert Bentley, former NFL player
Edgerrin James, former NFL player and 2021 Pro Football Hall of Fame Inductee
Javarris James, former NFL player
J. C. Jackson, cornerback for Los Angeles Chargers
Ovince St. Preux, wrestler and collegiate football player for the Tennessee Volunteers, MMA fighter
Brian Rolle, current CFL player
Aaron Henry, current college football coach

Demographics

Gender 
 Male: 939 (51.82%)
 Female: 873 (48.18%)

Ethnicity 
 White: 26 (1.4%)
 Black: 308 (17%)
 Hispanic: 1,457 (80.4%)
 Multiracial: 9 (0.35%)
 Native American: 11 (0.61%)
 Asian: 1 (0.06%)

References

External links
 

High schools in Collier County, Florida